Krasnoyarsk Time (KRAT) is the time zone seven hours ahead of UTC (UTC+07:00) and 4 hours ahead of Moscow Time (MSK+4).  KRAT is the official time zone for central and east Siberian regions of Krasnoyarsk Krai, Kemerovo Oblast, Khakassia and Tuva.

Novosibirsk Oblast used this time zone until 1993, when it was known as Novosibirsk Time (NOVT/NOVST). The Russian government renamed the time zone shortly after Novosibirsk opted for another time zone instead.

Between 27 March 2011 and 25 October 2014, Krasnoyarsk Time was fixed at UTC+08:00.

In 2016, the Altai Republic, Altai Krai, Novosibirsk Oblast, and Tomsk Oblast, switched to Krasnoyarsk Time from Omsk Time.

IANA time zone database
The IANA time zone database identifier is Asia/Krasnoyarsk.

References 

Time zones
Time in Russia